Ban Xang Khong or Ban Sang Khong is a village in Luang Prabang Province, Laos. The Lue peoples of this village are noted in particular for their arts and crafts. The locals are adept at making traditional Saa paper, which is made from mulberry trees. There are several bamboo bridges in the area, and the village can be approached on foot from Luang Prabang.

References

Populated places in Luang Prabang Province